The gastric lymph nodes are lymph nodes which drain the stomach and consist of two sets, superior and inferior:
 The superior gastric lymph nodes accompany the left gastric artery and are divisible into three groups: 
 Upper, on the stem of the artery;
 Lower, accompanying the descending branches of the artery along the cardiac half of the lesser curvature of the stomach, between the two layers of the lesser omentum;
 Paracardial outlying members of the gastric lymph nodes, disposed in a manner comparable to a chain of beads around the neck of the stomach. They receive their afferents from the stomach; their efferents pass to the celiac group of preaortic lymph nodes.
 The inferior gastric lymph nodes (right gastroepiploic lymph nodes), four to seven in number, lie between the two layers of the greater omentum along the pyloric half of the greater curvature of the stomach.

References

Additional images

Lymphatics of the torso
Lymph nodes